Tutira is a village to the north of Napier and is part of the Hawke's Bay Region in New Zealand's North Island. It is located on State Highway 2 between Wairoa and Napier.

Much of the area was surveyed by Herbert Guthrie-Smith, who farmed 60,000 acres (240 km²) surrounding Lake Tūtira. Guthrie-Smith, a naturalist, published the popular Tutira: the story of a New Zealand sheep station in 1921. Today, a camp is run at the site of his homestead.

Demographics

Puketitiri-Tutira had a population of 1,839 at the 2018 New Zealand census, an increase of 87 people (5.0%) since the 2013 census, and an increase of 96 people (5.5%) since the 2006 census. There were 708 households, comprising 969 males and 870 females, giving a sex ratio of 1.11 males per female. The median age was 40.2 years (compared with 37.4 years nationally), with 387 people (21.0%) aged under 15 years, 309 (16.8%) aged 15 to 29, 936 (50.9%) aged 30 to 64, and 201 (10.9%) aged 65 or older.

Ethnicities were 84.2% European/Pākehā, 22.3% Māori, 2.3% Pacific peoples, 1.6% Asian, and 2.4% other ethnicities. People may identify with more than one ethnicity.

The percentage of people born overseas was 9.8, compared with 27.1% nationally.

Although some people chose not to answer the census's question about religious affiliation, 57.7% had no religion, 30.8% were Christian, 3.1% had Māori religious beliefs, 0.2% were Muslim, 0.2% were Buddhist and 1.6% had other religions.

Of those at least 15 years old, 186 (12.8%) people had a bachelor's or higher degree, and 261 (18.0%) people had no formal qualifications. The median income was $34,200, compared with $31,800 nationally. 186 people (12.8%) earned over $70,000 compared to 17.2% nationally. The employment status of those at least 15 was that 843 (58.1%) people were employed full-time, 261 (18.0%) were part-time, and 36 (2.5%) were unemployed.

Education

References

Populated places in the Hawke's Bay Region
Hastings District